Boogie Woogie Red (October 18, 1925 – July 2, 1992) was an American Detroit blues, boogie-woogie and jazz pianist, singer and songwriter. At different times he worked with Sonny Boy Williamson I, Washboard Willie, Baby Boy Warren, Lonnie Johnson, Tampa Red, John Lee Hooker and Memphis Slim.

Biography
He was born Vernon Harrison in Rayville, Louisiana, and moved to Detroit in 1927. In his adolescence, he began performing in local clubs and worked alongside Sonny Boy Williamson I, Baby Boy Warren and John Lee Hooker.

In the mid-1970s, Boogie Woogie Red played solo piano at the Blind Pig, a small bar in Ann Arbor, Michigan. He recorded his own albums in 1974 and 1977 and toured Europe in that decade. Red appeared on BBC Television's Old Grey Whistle Test in May 1973.

He died in July 1992, at the age of 66, in Detroit.

Discography
Live at the Blind Pig (1974), Blind Pig Records
Red Hot (1977), Blind Pig Records

See also
List of boogie woogie musicians
List of Detroit blues musicians

References

External links
Mini biography and photograph at Blindpigrecords.com

1925 births
1992 deaths
American blues pianists
American male pianists
American blues singers
American jazz pianists
Songwriters from Louisiana
Boogie-woogie pianists
Detroit blues musicians
20th-century American singers
Blues musicians from Louisiana
20th-century American pianists
Singers from Louisiana
People from Rayville, Louisiana
Jazz musicians from Louisiana
20th-century American male singers
American male jazz musicians
Blind Pig Records artists
American male songwriters